The timeline of the early universe outlines the formation and subsequent evolution of the Universe from the Big Bang (13.799 ± 0.021 billion years ago) to the present day. An epoch is a moment in time from which nature or situations change to such a degree that it marks the beginning of a new era or age.

Times on this list are measured from the moment of the Big Bang.

The first 20 minutes

Planck epoch
 c. 0 seconds (13.799 ± 0.021 Gya): Planck epoch begins: earliest meaningful time. The Big Bang occurs in which ordinary space and time develop out of a primeval state (possibly a virtual particle or false vacuum) described by a quantum theory of gravity or "Theory of Everything". All matter and energy of the entire visible universe is contained in a hot, dense point (gravitational singularity), a billionth the size of a nuclear particle. This state has been described as a particle desert. Other than a few scant details, conjecture dominates discussion about the earliest moments of the universe's history since no effective means of testing this far back in space-time is presently available. WIMPS (weakly interacting massive particles) or dark matter and dark energy may have appeared and been the catalyst for the expansion of the singularity. The infant universe cools as it begins expanding outward. It is almost completely smooth, with quantum variations beginning to cause slight variations in density.

Grand unification epoch
 c. 10−43 seconds: Grand unification epoch begins: While still at an infinitesimal size, the universe cools down to 1032 kelvin. Gravity separates and begins operating on the universe—the remaining fundamental forces stabilize into the electronuclear force, also known as the Grand Unified Force or Grand Unified Theory (GUT), mediated by (the hypothetical) X and Y bosons which allow early matter at this stage to fluctuate between baryon and lepton states.

Electroweak epoch
c. 10−36 seconds: Electroweak epoch begins: The Universe cools down to 1028 kelvin. As a result, the strong nuclear force becomes distinct from the electroweak force perhaps fuelling the inflation of the universe. A wide array of exotic elementary particles result from decay of X and Y bosons which include W and Z bosons and Higgs bosons.
c. 10−33 seconds: Space is subjected to inflation, expanding by a factor of the order of 1026 over a time of the order of 10−33 to 10−32 seconds. The universe is supercooled from about 1027 down to 1022 kelvin. 
c. 10−32 seconds: Cosmic inflation ends. The familiar elementary particles now form as a soup of hot ionized gas called quark–gluon plasma; hypothetical components of cold dark matter (such as axions) would also have formed at this time.

Quark epoch
c. 10−12 seconds: Electroweak phase transition: the four fundamental interactions familiar from the modern universe now operate as distinct forces. The weak nuclear force is now a short-range force as it separates from electromagnetic force, so matter particles can acquire mass and interact with the Higgs Field. The temperature is still too high for quarks to coalesce into hadrons, and the quark–gluon plasma persists (Quark epoch). The universe cools to 1015 kelvin.
c. 10−11 seconds: Baryogenesis may have taken place with matter gaining the upper hand over anti-matter as baryon to antibaryon constituencies are established.

Hadron epoch
c. 10−6 seconds: Hadron epoch begins: As the universe cools to about 1010 kelvin, a quark-hadron transition takes place in which quarks bind to form more complex particles—hadrons. This quark confinement includes the formation of protons and neutrons (nucleons), the building blocks of atomic nuclei.

Lepton epoch
c. 1 second: Lepton epoch begins: The universe cools to 109 kelvin. At this temperature, the hadrons and antihadrons annihilate each other, leaving behind leptons and antileptons – possible disappearance of antiquarks. Gravity governs the expansion of the universe: neutrinos decouple from matter creating a cosmic neutrino background.

Photon epoch
 c. 10 seconds: Photon epoch begins: Most of the leptons and antileptons annihilate each other. As electrons and positrons annihilate, a small number of unmatched electrons are left over – disappearance of the positrons.
 c. 10 seconds: Universe dominated by photons of radiation – ordinary matter particles are coupled to light and radiation while dark matter particles start building non-linear structures as dark matter halos. Because charged electrons and protons hinder the emission of light, the universe becomes a super-hot glowing fog.
 c. 3 minutes: Primordial nucleosynthesis: nuclear fusion begins as lithium and heavy hydrogen (deuterium) and helium nuclei form from protons and neutrons.
 c. 20 minutes: Nuclear fusion ceases: normal matter consists of 75% hydrogen nuclei and 25% helium nuclei – free electrons begin scattering light.

Matter era

Matter and radiation equivalence 

c. 47,000 years (z=3600): Matter and radiation equivalence: at the beginning of this era, the expansion of the universe was decelerating at a faster rate.
c. 70,000 years: Matter domination in Universe: onset of gravitational collapse as the Jeans length at which the smallest structure can form begins to fall.

Cosmic Dark Age

 c. 370,000 years (z=1,100): The "Dark Ages" is the period between decoupling, when the universe first becomes transparent, until the formation of the first stars. Recombination: electrons combine with nuclei to form atoms, mostly hydrogen and helium. Distributions of hydrogen and helium at this time remains constant as the electron-baryon plasma thins. The temperature falls to 3000 kelvin. Ordinary matter particles decouple from radiation. The photons present at the time of decoupling are the same photons that we see in the cosmic microwave background (CMB) radiation.
 c. 400,000 years: Density waves begin imprinting characteristic polarization (waves) signals.
 c. 10-17 million years: The "Dark Ages" span a period during which the temperature of cosmic background radiation cooled from some 4000 K down to about 60 K. The background temperature was between 373 K and 273 K, allowing the possibility of liquid water, during a period of about 7 million years, from about 10 to 17 million after the Big Bang (redshift 137–100). Loeb (2014) speculated that primitive life might in principle have appeared during this window, which he called "the Habitable Epoch of the Early Universe".
 c. 100 million years: Gravitational collapse: ordinary matter particles fall into the structures created by dark matter. Reionization begins: smaller (stars) and larger non-linear structures (quasars) begin to take shape – their ultraviolet light ionizes remaining neutral gas.
 200–300 million years: First stars begin to shine: Because many are Population III stars (some Population II stars are accounted for at this time) they are much bigger and hotter and their life cycle is fairly short. Unlike later generations of stars, these stars are metal free. Reionization begins, with the absorption of certain wavelengths of light by neutral hydrogen creating Gunn–Peterson troughs. The resulting ionized gas (especially free electrons) in the intergalactic medium causes some scattering of light, but with much lower opacity than before recombination due the expansion of the universe and clumping of gas into galaxies.
 200 million years: HD 140283, the "Methuselah" Star, formed, the unconfirmed oldest star observed in the Universe. Because it is a Population II star, some suggestions have been raised that second generation star formation may have begun very early on. The oldest-known star (confirmed) – SMSS J031300.36-670839.3, forms.
 300 million years: First large-scale astronomical objects, protogalaxies and quasars may have begun forming. As Population III stars continue to burn, stellar nucleosynthesis operates – stars burn mainly by fusing hydrogen to produce more helium in what is referred to as the main sequence. Over time these stars are forced to fuse helium to produce carbon, oxygen, silicon and other heavy elements up to iron on the periodic table. These elements, when seeded into neighbouring gas clouds by supernova, will lead to the formation of more Population II stars (metal poor) and gas giants.
 380 million years: UDFj-39546284 forms, current record holder for unconfirmed oldest-known quasar.
 400 million years (z=11): GN-z11, the oldest-known galaxy, forms.
 420 million years: The quasar MACS0647-JD, the, or one of the, furthest known quasars, forms.
 600 million years HE 1523-0901, the oldest star found producing neutron capture elements forms, marking a new point in ability to detect stars with a telescope.
 630 million years (z=8.2): GRB 090423, the oldest gamma ray burst recorded suggests that supernovas may have happened very early on in the evolution of the Universe
 670 million years: EGS-zs8-1, the most distant starburst or Lyman-break galaxy observed, forms. This suggests that galaxy interaction is taking place very early on in the history of the Universe as starburst galaxies are often associated with collisions and galaxy mergers.
 700 million years: Galaxies form. Smaller galaxies begin merging to form larger ones. Galaxy classes may have also begun forming at this time including Blazars, Seyfert galaxies, radio galaxies, and dwarf galaxies as well as regular types (elliptical, barred spiral, and spiral galaxies). UDFy-38135539, the first distant quasar to be observed from the reionization phase, forms. Dwarf galaxy z8 GND 5296 forms. Galaxy or possible proto-galaxy A1689-zD1 forms.
 720 million years: Possible formation of globular clusters in Milky Way's Galactic halo. Formation of globular cluster, NGC 6723, in the Milky Way's galactic halo 
 740 million years: 47 Tucanae, second-brightest globular cluster in the Milky Way, forms
 750 million years: Galaxy IOK-1 a Lyman alpha emitter galaxy, forms. GN-108036 forms—galaxy is 5 times larger and 100 times more massive than the present day Milky Way illustrating the size attained by some galaxies very early on.
 770 million years: Quasar ULAS J1120+0641, one of the most distant, forms. One of the earliest galaxies to feature a supermassive black hole suggesting that such large objects existed quite soon after the Big Bang. The large fraction of neutral hydrogen in its spectrum suggests it may also have just formed or is in the process of star formation.
 800 million years: Farthest extent of Hubble Ultra-Deep Field. Formation of SDSS J102915+172927: unusual population II star that is extremely metal poor consisting of mainly hydrogen and helium. HE0107-5240, one of the oldest Population II stars, forms as part of a binary star system. LAE J095950.99+021219.1, one of the most remote Lyman alpha emitter galaxies, forms. Lyman alpha emitters are considered to be the progenitors of spiral galaxies like the Milky Way. Messier 2, globular cluster, forms.
 870 million years: Messier 30 forms in the Milky Way. Having experienced a Core collapse (cluster), the cluster has one of the highest densities among globular clusters.
 890 million years: Galaxy SXDF-NB1006-2 forms
 900 million years: Galaxy BDF-3299 forms. 
 910 million years: Galaxy BDF-521 forms

Galaxy epoch 

 1 billion years (12.8 Gya, z=6.56): Galaxy HCM-6A, the most distant normal galaxy observed, forms. Formation of hyper-luminous quasar SDSS J0100+2802, which harbors a black hole with mass of 12 billion solar masses, one of the most massive black holes discovered so early in the universe. HE1327-2326, a population II star, is speculated to have formed from remnants of earlier Population III stars. Visual limit of the Hubble Deep Field. Reionization is complete, with intergalactic space no longer showing any absorption lines from neutral hydrogen in the form of Gunn–Peterson troughs. Photon scattering by free electrons continues to decrease as the universe expands and gas falls into galaxies, and intergalactic space is now highly transparent, though remaining clouds of neutral hydrogen cause Lyman-alpha forests. Galaxy evolution continues as more modern looking galaxies form and develop, although barred spiral and elliptical galaxies are more rare than today. Because the Universe is still small in size, galaxy interactions become common place with larger and larger galaxies forming out of the galaxy merger process. Galaxies may have begun clustering creating the largest structures in the Universe so far – the first galaxy clusters and galaxy superclusters appear.
 1.1 billion years (12.7 Gya): Age of the quasar CFHQS 1641+3755. Messier 4 Globular Cluster, first to have its individual stars resolved, forms in the halo of the Milky Way Galaxy. Among the clusters' many stars, PSR B1620-26 b forms. It is a gas giant known as the "Genesis Planet" or "Methusaleh." The oldest observed exoplanet in the Universe, it orbits a pulsar and a white dwarf.
 1.13 billion years (12.67 Gya): Messier 12, globular cluster, forms
 1.3 billion years (12.5 Gya): WISE J224607.57-052635.0, a luminous infrared galaxy, forms. PSR J1719-1438 b, known as the Diamond Planet, forms around a pulsar. 
 1.31 billion years (12.49 Gya): Globular Cluster Messier 53 forms 60,000 light-years from the Galactic Center of the Milky Way
 1.39 billion years (12.41 Gya): S5 0014+81, a hyper-luminous quasar, forms
 1.4 billion years (12.4 Gya): Age of Cayrel's Star, BPS C531082-0001, a neutron capture star, among the oldest Population II stars in Milky Way. Quasar RD1, first object observed to exceed redshift 5, forms.
 1.44 billion years (12.36 Gya): Messier 80 globular cluster forms in Milky Way – known for large number of "blue stragglers"
 1.5 billion years (12.3 Gya): Messier 55, globular cluster, forms
 1.8 billion years (12 Gya): Most energetic gamma ray burst lasting 23 minutes, GRB 080916C, recorded. Baby Boom Galaxy forms. Terzan 5 forms as a small dwarf galaxy on collision course with the Milky Way. Dwarf galaxy carrying the Methusaleh Star consumed by Milky Way – oldest-known star in the Universe becomes one of many population II stars of the Milky Way
 2.0 billion years (11.8 Gya): SN 1000+0216, the oldest observed supernova occurs – possible pulsar formed. Globular Cluster Messier 15, known to have an intermediate black hole and the only globular cluster observed to include a planetary nebula, Pease 1, forms
 2.02 billion years (11.78 Gya): Messier 62 forms – contains high number of variable stars (89) many of which are RR Lyrae stars.
 2.2 billion years (11.6 Gya): Globular Cluster NGC 6752, third-brightest, forms in Milky Way
 2.4 billion years (11.4 Gya): Quasar PKS 2000-330 forms.
 2.41 billion years (11.39 Gya): Messier 10 globular cluster forms. Messier 3 forms: prototype for the Oosterhoff type I cluster, which is considered "metal-rich". That is, for a globular cluster, Messier 3 has a relatively high abundance of heavier elements.
 2.5 billion years (11.3 Gya): Omega Centauri, largest globular cluster in the Milky Way forms
 2.6 billion years (11.2 Gya): HD 130322 planetary system, known as the first observed exoplanet system, forms
 3.0 billion years (10.8 billion Gya): Formation of the Gliese 581 planetary system: Gliese 581c, the first observed ocean planet and Gliese 581d, a super-Earth planet, possibly the first observed habitable planets, form. Gliese 581d has more potential for forming life since it is the first exoplanet of terrestrial mass proposed that orbits within the habitable zone of its parent star.
 3.3 billion years (10.5 Gya): BX442, oldest grand design spiral galaxy observed, forms
 3.5 billion years (10.3 Gya): Supernova SN UDS10Wil recorded
 3.8 billion years (10 Gya): NGC 2808 globular cluster forms: 3 generations of stars form within the first 200 million years.
 4.0 billion years (9.8 Gya): Quasar 3C 9 forms. The Andromeda Galaxy forms from a galactic merger – begins a collision course with the Milky Way. Barnard's Star, red dwarf star, may have formed. Beethoven Burst GRB 991216 recorded. Gliese 677 Cc, a planet in the habitable zone of its parent star, Gliese 667, forms
 4.5 billion years (9.3 Gya): Fierce star formation in Andromeda making it into a luminous infra-red galaxy
 5.0 billion years (8.8 Gya): Earliest Population I, or Sunlike stars: with heavy element saturation so high, planetary nebula appear in which rocky substances are solidified – these nurseries lead to the formation of rocky terrestrial planets, moons, asteroids, and icy comets
 5.1 billion years (8.7 Gya): Galaxy collision: spiral arms of the Milky Way form leading to major period of star formation.
 5.3 billion years (8.5 Gya): 55 Cancri B, a "hot Jupiter", first planet to be observed orbiting as part of a star system, forms. Kepler 11 planetary system, the flattest and most compact system yet discovered, forms – Kepler 11 c considered to be a giant ocean planet with hydrogen-helium atmosphere.
 5.8 billion years (8 Gya): 51 Pegasi b also known as Bellerophon, forms – first planet discovered orbiting a main sequence star
 5.9 billion years (7.9 Gya): HD 176051 planetary system, known as the first observed through astrometrics, forms
 6.0 billion years (7.8 Gya): Many galaxies like NGC 4565 become relatively stable – ellipticals result from collisions of spirals with some like IC 1101 being extremely massive.
 6.0 billion years (7.8 Gya): The Universe continues to organize into larger wider structures. The great walls, sheets and filaments consisting of galaxy clusters and superclusters and voids crystallize. How this crystallization takes place is still conjecture. Certainly, it is possible the formation of super-structures like the Hercules–Corona Borealis Great Wall may have happened much earlier, perhaps around the same time galaxies first started appearing. Either way the observable universe becomes more modern looking.
 6.2 billion years (7.7 Gya): 16 Cygni Bb, the first gas giant observed in a single star orbit in a trinary star system, forms – orbiting moons considered to have habitable properties or at the least capable of supporting water
 6.3 billion years (7.5 Gya, z=0.94): GRB 080319B, farthest gamma ray burst seen with the naked eye, recorded. Terzan 7, metal-rich globular cluster, forms in the Sagittarius Dwarf Elliptical Galaxy
 6.5 billion years (7.3 Gya): HD 10180 planetary system forms (larger than both 55 Cancri and Kepler 11 systems)
 6.9 billion years (6.9 Gya): Orange Giant, Arcturus, forms
 7.64 billion years (6.16 Gya): Mu Arae planetary system forms: of four planets orbiting a yellow star, Mu Arae c is among the first terrestrial planets to be observed from Earth
 7.8 billion years (6.0 Gya): Formation of Earth's near twin, Kepler 452b orbiting its parent star Kepler 452
 7.98 billion years (5.82 Gya): Formation of Mira or Omicron ceti, binary star system. Formation of Alpha Centauri Star System, closest star to the Sun. GJ 1214 b, or Gliese 1214 b, potential Earth-like planet, forms
 8.2 billion years (5.6 Gya): Tau Ceti, nearby yellow star forms: five planets eventually evolve from its planetary nebula, orbiting the star – Tau Ceti e considered planet to have potential life since it orbits the hot inner edge of the star's habitable zone
 8.5 billion years (5.3 Gya): GRB 101225A, the "Christmas Burst", considered the longest at 28 minutes, recorded

Acceleration
 8.8 billion years (5 Gya, z=0.5): Acceleration: dark-energy dominated era begins, following the matter-dominated era during which cosmic expansion was slowing down.
 8.8 billion years (5 Gya): Messier 67 open star cluster forms: Three exoplanets confirmed orbiting stars in the cluster including a twin of the Sun
 9.0 billion years (4.8 Gya): Lalande 21185, red dwarf in Ursa Major, forms
 9.13 billion years (4.67 Gya): Proxima Centauri forms completing the Alpha Centauri trinary system

Epochs of the formation of the Solar System 

 9.2 billion years (4.6–4.57 Gya): Primal supernova, possibly triggers the formation of the Solar System.
 9.2318 billion years (4.5682 Gya): Sun forms – Planetary nebula begins accretion of planets.
 9.23283 billion years (4.56717–4.55717 Gya): Four Jovian planets (Jupiter, Saturn, Uranus, Neptune ) evolve around the sun.
 9.257 billion years (4.543–4.5 Gya): Solar System of Eight planets, four terrestrial (Mercury (planet), Venus, Earth, Mars) evolve around the Sun.  Because of accretion many smaller planets form orbits around the proto-Sun some with conflicting orbits – Early Heavy Bombardment begins. Precambrian Supereon and Hadean eon begin on Earth. Pre-Noachian Era begins on Mars. Pre-Tolstojan Period begins on Mercury – a large planetoid strikes Mercury stripping it of outer envelope of original crust and mantle, leaving the planet's core exposed – Mercury's iron content is notably high. Many of the Galilean moons may have formed at this time including Europa and Titan which may presently be hospitable to some form of living organism.
 9.266 billion years (4.533 Gya): Formation of Earth-Moon system following giant impact by hypothetical planetoid Theia (planet). Moon's gravitational pull helps stabilize Earth's fluctuating axis of rotation. Pre-Nectarian Period begins on Moon
 9.271 billion years (4.529 Gya): Major collision with a pluto-sized planetoid establishes the Martian dichotomy on Mars – formation of North Polar Basin of Mars
 9.3 billion years (4.5 Gya): Sun becomes a main sequence yellow star: formation of the Oort Cloud and Kuiper Belt from which a stream of comets like Halley's Comet and Hale-Bopp begins passing through the Solar System, sometimes colliding with planets and the Sun 
 9.396 billion years (4.404 Gya): Liquid water may have existed on the surface of the Earth, probably due to the greenhouse warming of high levels of methane and carbon dioxide present in the atmosphere.
 9.4 billion years (4.4 Gya): Formation of Kepler 438 b, one of the most Earth-like planets, from a protoplanetary nebula surrounding its parent star
 9.5 billion years (4.3 Gya): Massive meteorite impact creates South Pole Aitken Basin on the Moon – a huge chain of mountains located on the lunar southern limb, sometimes called "Leibnitz mountains", form
 9.6 billion years (4.2 Gya): Tharsis Bulge widespread area of vulcanism, becomes active on Mars – based on the intensity of volcanic activity on Earth, Tharsis magmas may have produced a 1.5-bar  atmosphere and a global layer of water 120 m deep increasing greenhouse gas effect in climate and adding to Martian water table. Age of the oldest samples from the Lunar Maria
 9.7 billion years (4.1 Gya): Resonance in Jupiter and Saturn's orbits moves Neptune out into the Kuiper belt causing a disruption among asteroids and comets there. As a result, Late Heavy Bombardment batters the inner Solar System. Herschel Crater formed on Mimas (moon), a moon of Saturn. Meteorite impact creates the Hellas Planitia on Mars, the largest unambiguous structure on the planet. Anseris Mons an isolated massif (mountain) in the southern highlands of Mars, located at the northeastern edge of Hellas Planitia is uplifted in the wake of the meteorite impact
 9.8 billion years (4 Gya): HD 209458 b, first planet detected through its transit, forms. Messier 85, lenticular galaxy, disrupted by galaxy interaction: complex outer structure of shells and ripples results. Andromeda and Triangulum galaxies experience close encounter – high levels of star formation in Andromeda while Triangulum's outer disc is distorted
 9.861 billion years (3.938 Gya): Major period of impacts on the Moon: Mare Imbrium forms
 9.88 billion years (3.92 Gya): Nectaris Basin forms from large impact event: ejecta from Nectaris forms upper part of densely cratered Lunar Highlands – Nectarian Era begins on the Moon.
 9.9 billion years (3.9 Gya): Tolstoj (crater) forms on Mercury. Caloris Basin forms on Mercury leading to creation of "Weird Terraine" – seismic activity triggers volcanic activity globally on Mercury. Rembrandt (crater) formed on Mercury. Caloris Period begins on Mercury. Argyre Planitia forms from asteroid impact on Mars: surrounded by rugged massifs which form concentric and radial patterns around basin – several mountain ranges including Charitum and Nereidum Montes are uplifted in its wake
 9.95 billion years (3.85 Gya): Beginning of Late Imbrium Period on Moon. Earliest appearance of Procellarum KREEP Mg suite materials
 9.96 billion years (3.84 Gya): Formation of Orientale Basin from asteroid impact on Lunar surface – collision causes ripples in crust, resulting in three concentric circular features known as Montes Rook and Montes Cordillera
 10 billion years (3.8 Gya): In the wake of Late Heavy Bombardment impacts on the Moon, large molten mare depressions dominate lunar surface – major period of Lunar vulcanism begins (to 3 Gyr). Archean eon begins on the Earth.
 10.2 billion years (3.6 Gya): Alba Mons forms on Mars, largest volcano in terms of area
 10.4 billion years (3.5 Gya): Earliest fossil traces of life on Earth (stromatolites)
 10.6 billion years (3.2 Gya): Amazonian Period begins on Mars: Martian climate thins to its present density: groundwater stored in upper crust (megaregolith) begins to freeze, forming thick cryosphere overlying deeper zone of liquid water – dry ices composed of frozen carbon dioxide form Eratosthenian period begins on the Moon: main geologic force on the Moon becomes impact cratering
 10.8 billion years (3 Gya): Beethoven Basin forms on Mercury – unlike many basins of similar size on the Moon, Beethoven is not multi ringed and ejecta buries crater rim and is barely visible
 11.2 billion years (2.5 Gya): Proterozoic begins
 11.6 billion years (2.2 Gya): Last great tectonic period in Martian geologic history: Valles Marineris, largest canyon complex in the Solar System, forms – although some suggestions of thermokarst activity or even water erosion, it is suggested Valles Marineris is rift fault

Recent history
 11.8 billion years (2 Gya): Star formation in Andromeda Galaxy slows. Formation of Hoag's Object from a galaxy collision. Olympus Mons, the largest volcano in the Solar System, is formed
 12.1 billion years (1.7 Gya): Sagittarius Dwarf Elliptical Galaxy captured into an orbit around Milky Way Galaxy
 12.7 billion years (1.1 Gya): Copernican Period begins on Moon: defined by impact craters that possess bright optically immature ray systems
 12.8 billion years (1 Gya): The Kuiperian Era (1 Gyr – present) begins on Mercury: modern Mercury, a desolate cold planet that is influenced by space erosion and solar wind extremes. Interactions between Andromeda and its companion galaxies Messier 32 and Messier 110. Galaxy collision with Messier 82 forms its patterned spiral disc: galaxy interactions between NGC 3077 and Messier 81; Saturn's moon Titan begins evolving the recognisable surface features that include rivers, lakes, and deltas
 13 billion years (800 Mya): Copernicus (lunar crater) forms from the impact on the Lunar surface in the area of Oceanus Procellarum – has terrace inner wall and 30  km wide, sloping rampart that descends nearly a kilometre to the surrounding mare
 13.175 billion years (625 Mya): formation of Hyades star cluster: consists of a roughly spherical group of hundreds of stars sharing the same age, place of origin, chemical content and motion through space
 13.15-21 billion years (590–650 Mya): Capella star system forms
 13.2 billion years (600 Mya):	Collision of spiral galaxies leads to the creation of Antenna Galaxies. Whirlpool Galaxy collides with NGC 5195 forming a present connected galaxy system. HD 189733 b forms around parent star HD 189733: the first planet to reveal the climate, organic constituencies, even colour (blue) of its atmosphere
 13.345 billion years (455 Mya):  Vega, the fifth-brightest star in Earth's galactic neighbourhood, forms. 
 13.6–13.5 billion years (300-200 Mya): Sirius, the brightest star in the Earth's sky, forms. 
 13.7 billion years (100 Mya):  Formation of Pleiades Star Cluster
 13.73 billion years (70 Mya): North Star, Polaris, one of the significant navigable stars, forms
 13.780 billion years (20 Mya):  Possible formation of Orion Nebula
 13.788 billion years (12 Mya): Antares forms.
 13.792 billion years (7.6 Mya): Betelgeuse forms.
 13.8 billion years (Without uncertainties): Present day.

See also
 Timeline of natural history (formation of the Earth to evolution of modern humans)
 Detailed logarithmic timeline
 Timeline of the far future
 Timelines of world history

References

Formation of the Universe
Formation of the Universe
cosmology epochs